Members of the New South Wales Legislative Assembly who served in the 30th  parliament held their seats from 1932 to 1935. They were elected at the 1932 state election, and at by-elections. The Speaker was Sir Daniel Levy.

See also
First Stevens ministry
Results of the 1932 New South Wales state election
Candidates of the 1932 New South Wales state election

References

Members of New South Wales parliaments by term
20th-century Australian politicians